Gujarati Americans are Americans who trace their ancestry to Gujarat, India. They are a subgroup of Indian Americans.

The highest concentration of the Gujarati American population by a significant margin, with over 100,000 Gujarati individuals, is in the New York City Metropolitan Area, notably in the growing Gujarati diasporic center of India Square, or Little Gujarat, in Jersey City, New Jersey, and Edison in Middlesex County in Central New Jersey. Significant immigration from India to the United States started after the landmark Immigration and Nationality Act of 1965, Early immigrants after 1965 were highly educated professionals. Since US immigration laws allow sponsoring immigration of parents, children and particularly siblings on the basis of family reunion, the numbers rapidly swelled in a phenomenon known as "chain migration". Faith plays a big role in the rapidly growing Gujarati community in North Texas, which has three large Hindu temples. Census numbers showed that from 2000 to 2010, the population more than doubled, going from 49,181 to 106,964 for Collin, Dallas, Denton, Rockwall and Tarrant counties. Richardson has a long-established Gujarati population, and it was there that a group of businessmen founded the India Association of North Texas (1962). Changes in recent years have been more drastic.

Given the Gujarati propensity for entrepreneurship and business enterprise, a number of them opened shops and motels. Now in the 21st century over 40% of the hospitality industry in the United States is controlled by Gujaratis. Gujaratis, especially the Patidar samaj, also dominate as franchisees of fast food restaurant chains such as Subway and Dunkin' Donuts. The descendants of the Gujarati immigrant generation have also made high levels of advancement into professional fields, including as physicians, engineers and politicians. In August 2016, Air India commenced direct, one-seat flight service between Ahmedabad and Newark Liberty International Airport in New Jersey, via London Heathrow International Airport.

Notable people
 Bharat Desai (b. 1952), billionaire and  chairman Syntel 
 Vyomesh Joshi (b. 1954), CEO of 3D Systems 
 Ami Bera (b. 1965), Representative for California 
 Reshma Saujani (b. 1975), lawyer and politician 
 Sonal Shah (b. 1968), economist, corporate lobbyist, and public official 
 Sheetal Sheth (b. 1976), actress and producer 
 Kal Penn (b. 1977), actor and comedian
 Raj Bhavsar (b. 1980), artistic gymnast
 Kash Patel Government official under President Trump 
 Noureen DeWulf (b. 1984), actress
 Halim Dhanidina, first Muslim judge in California
 Savan Kotecha, Grammy-nominated  songwriter 
 Mafat and Tulsi Patel, founders Patel Brothers supermarket chain
 Rohit Vyas, journalist
Avani Gregg, social media personality

See also

 Indians in the New York City metropolitan region

References

 
Gujarati diaspora